Satkhira Stadium is located by the Thana Rd, Satkhira, Bangladesh.

See also
Stadiums in Bangladesh
List of cricket grounds in Bangladesh
Sheikh Kamal International Stadium, Cox's Bazar
Sheikh Kamal International Stadium, Gopalganj

References

Cricket grounds in Bangladesh
Football venues in Bangladesh